Tibersyrnola unifasciata is a species of sea snail, a marine gastropod mollusk in the family Pyramidellidae, the pyrams and their allies.

THe synonym Syrnola wenzi was named after Wilhelm August Wenz (1886-1945), a German malacologist.

Description
The shell is smooth and polished. It is white, with a median, narrow, light chestnut band. The teleoconch contains 11 flattened whorls. The length of the shell varies between 3 mm and 6.5 mm.

Distribution
This marine species occurs in rather deep water (200m - 700m) in the following locations:
 European waters (ERMS scope)
 Mediterranean Sea : Sicily, Greece
 Greek Exclusive Economic Zone
 Portuguese Exclusive Economic Zone (the Azores)
 Spanish Exclusive Economic Zone
 United Kingdom Exclusive Economic Zone
 Canary Islands
 Atlantic Ocean off Mauritania

Notes
Additional information regarding this species:
 Habitat: Known from seamounts and knolls

References

 Graham A. (1971), British Prosobranchs, Synopses of the British Fauna, New series, No. 2; Linnean Society., London
 Nordsieck, F. (1972). Die europäischen Meeresschnecken (Opisthobranchia mit Pyramidellidae; Rissoacea). Vom Eismeer bis Kapverden, Mittelmeer und Schwarzes Meer. Gustav Fischer, Stuttgart. XIII + 327 pp.
 Fenaux A. (1942). Mollusques nouveaux du littoral occidental de la Méditerranée. Bulletin de l'Institut Océanographique 825-826-827: 2-3

External links
  Serge GOFAS, Ángel A. LUQUE, Joan Daniel OLIVER,José TEMPLADO & Alberto SERRA (2021) - The Mollusca of Galicia Bank (NE Atlantic Ocean); European Journal of Taxonomy 785: 1–114
 To Biodiversity Heritage Library (10 publications)
 To CLEMAM
 To Encyclopedia of Life
 To World Register of Marine Species
 
 Forbes E. (1844). Report on the Mollusca and Radiata of the Aegean sea, and on their distribution, considered as bearing on geology. Reports of the British Association for the Advancement of Science for 1843. 130-193
 Micali P., Nofroni I. & Smriglio C. (2014) Odostomia crassa Jeffreys, 1884 junior synonym of Tibersyrnola unifasciata (Forbes, 1844), new combination (Gastropoda Pyramidellidae). Biodiversity Journal 5(2): 209
 Jeffreys, J. G. (1884). On the Mollusca procured during the 'Lightning' and 'Porcupine' expeditions, 1868-70. (Part VIII). Proceedings of the Zoological Society of London. 1882: 341-372, pl. 26-28
  Gofas, S.; Luque, Á. A.; Templado, J.; Salas, C. (2017). A national checklist of marine Mollusca in Spanish waters. Scientia Marina. 81(2) : 241-254, and supplementary online material

Pyramidellidae
Gastropods described in 1844